Lacalma mniomima is a species of snout moth in the genus Lacalma. It was described by Alfred Jefferis Turner in 1912 and is known from Australia, including Queensland.

References

Moths described in 1912
Epipaschiinae